Sister is a compilation album by the band Letters to Cleo. It was released on November 3, 1998. The album's last track is a cover of Fleetwood Mac's "Dreams". Although it was the final Letters To Cleo album to be released through a major label, the material on the album pre-dates all their other work; tracks 1-7 are originally from their demo tape, and tracks 8-10 are rarities previously performed live, and track 11 was on a compilation honoring music of the '70s.

Track listing
"I See" (Hanley, McKenna) – 3:17
"Sister" (Hanley, McKenna) – 3:53
"Never Tell" (Hanley, McKenna) – 3:13
"He's Stayin" (Hanley, McKenna) – 3:03
"Clear Blue Water" (Hanley, McKenna) – 3:55
"Pete Beat" (Hanley, McKenna) – 4:41
"Boy" (Hanley, McKenna) – 2:56
"Green Eggs" (Hanley, McKenna) – 3:48
"You Dirty Rat" (Charlie Chesterman) – 3:32
"Secret Agent" (Lee Hazlewood) – 2:52
"Dreams" (Stevie Nicks) – 4:26

Personnel
Kay Hanley - vocals, guitar 
Stacy Jones - drums, vocals
Greg McKenna - lead guitar, vocals 
Scott Riebling - bass, vocals 
Brian Karp - bass
Mike Eisenstein - rhythm guitar, keyboards, vocals 
Tad Bouvè - guitar
Pete Whitehead - drums
Rick Griffin - bass
 Ted Garland - drums (tracks 1-3)

Production
Producers: Rick Griffin, David Porter
Engineers: Tim O'Heir, Tom Waltz
Mixing: Mike Denneen, Tim O'Heir
Mastering: Henk Kooistra
Recording technician: Tom Waltz
Art direction: Alphabet Arm

References

Letters to Cleo albums
1998 albums